James Ortlieb (born June 19, 1956) is an American film, television and theatre actor known for his roles in Roswell and Felicity. Ortlieb has also appeared in Broadway productions of Guys and Dolls and Of Mice and Men, Billy Elliot the Musical, and The Farnsworth Invention.

Raised in Hazlet, New Jersey, Ortlieb graduated from Raritan High School in 1974. He attended Glassboro State College (now Rowan University), planning to study music and play soccer, but dropped out shortly after suffering an injury on one of the first days of team practice and started acting. After a few years on the stage, he earned a degree in drama from the Mason Gross School of the Arts of Rutgers University.

Filmography

Film

Television

References 

1956 births
20th-century American actors
Male actors from New Jersey
People from Hazlet, New Jersey
Living people
Mason Gross School of the Arts alumni
Rowan University alumni